Neil J. Howard (born February 23, 1949 in Riverdale, Bronx, New York) is an American Thoroughbred horse racing trainer.

Howard began working for a racing stable in 1969 and went on to spend seven years as an assistant and stable foreman to future Hall of Fame trainer MacKenzie Miller before going out on his own in 1979.

With Summer Squall, in 1990 Neil Howard won the second leg of the U.S. Triple Crown series, the Preakness Stakes and in 2003 trained Mineshaft to American Horse of the Year honors.

References
 Biography for Neil Howard at Keeneland
 

1949 births
Living people
American horse trainers
People from the Bronx